Stephen Charles Thurlow (born April 25, 1942) is a former American football running back in the National Football League for the New York Giants and the Washington Redskins.  He played college football at Stanford University.

1942 births
Living people
Players of American football from Long Beach, California
American football running backs
Stanford Cardinal football players
New York Giants players
Washington Redskins players

Professional Statistics
https://www.pro-football-reference.com/players/T/ThurSt00.htm